55 Degrees North is a BBC television drama series starring Don Gilet as DS Nicky Cole, a London detective relocated to Newcastle upon Tyne after exposing police corruption. Dervla Kirwan co-stars as Claire Maxwell, an ambitious solicitor.

The first series was originally broadcast on BBC1 in 2004, with the second series following a year later. The programme was shown in the U.S. under its working title, The Night Detective. But it was axed in 2006, and production company Zenith North entered administrative receivership shortly thereafter; the programme's cancellation was described as a "heavy blow" for the company. Both series were released together in a complete box set on 26 June 2006.

Plot
Detective Sergeant Nicky Cole (Don Gilet) blows the whistle on a senior police officer guilty of corruption in London. Cole is then shunted up North to avoid any difficulties or fallout, and ends up in Newcastle upon Tyne as a Detective Sergeant in a busy CID with the fictional Tyneside Police. To begin with, he finds himself on the night shift and becomes increasingly frustrated at the inspector - DI Carter (Christian Rodska)'s - desire to keep him there despite the fact that his ability and motivation clearly exceed the demands of the job.

In the second series he becomes part of the day team and is a key member of the police squad that deals with, over the two series, a wide variety of crimes. Whilst developing his police career, Cole also finds time to help support the family he has brought to the North with him. His uncle, Errol Hill (George Harris), first-generation immigrant from Trinidad and Tobago, and nephew Matty (Jaeden Burke), are an integral part of Cole's life.

Cole's relationship with CPS lawyer, Claire Maxwell (Dervla Kirwan), provides another side to the story, as she is juggling work with caring for a baby, and Cole is caught between a rock and a hard place in choosing between her, or the attractive Sergeant, or one of Matty's school teachers. Another relationship developed is one between Cole and Sergeant Astel, who in the very first scene, smashes Cole's brake light after stopping him and not realising his status as a police officer. This awkward start turns into a strange but strong friendship by the end.

55 Degrees North is a police drama at heart, but covers many different aspects of life, including love and relationships and the importance of family. It also touches on such issues as racism and police corruption. Many crimes committed are pertinent to the age, and complex issues such as genetic engineering are tackled.

Tyneside Police

The exterior of the police station used in the programme is actually the base of HMS Calliope, a Royal Navy Reserve training centre for the North and North East. This building is located on the Gateshead bank of the River Tyne next to the Baltic Centre for Contemporary Art and the Gateshead Millennium Bridge.

The name given for the police force in the series was Tyneside Police; with a logo similar to that of the defunct Tyne and Wear County Council and uniforms with slightly altered badge labels borrowed from Northumbria Police, the real police force which covers the Newcastle upon Tyne area.

Cast
All characters had a major role in the series.

Episode list

Series 1 (2004)
The first series sees Cole work on the night shift, and thus, the majority of the scenes are filmed in the dark. This creates an air of suspicion and tension, and this is clear as Cole is unsure who he can trust. His two main co-workers are reluctant to forge a relationship with him, and his immediate commanding officer seems distant, harsh, and somewhat afraid that Cole may blow the whistle on his career if he steps at all out of line. The first series aired from 6 July to 10 August 2004. Christian Rodska (DI Carter) left the show at the end of this series.

Series 2 (2005)
The second series sees Cole make it on to the day shift, and the introduction of Detective Inspector Bing (Mark Lewis Jones). His character is honest, open and amusing, and signals a stark contrast between the two series. He creates a more positive impression, and allows the show to move in a different direction. The series aired from 22 May to 10 July 2005.

References

External links
 
 55 Degrees North, BBC Press Office, bbc.co.uk.
 55 Degrees North (TV Series 2004–2005) 55 Degrees North at the Internet Movie Database

BBC television dramas
2000s British drama television series
2004 British television series debuts
2005 British television series endings
Television shows set in Tyne and Wear
Television shows set in Newcastle upon Tyne
English-language television shows